Kai Ilmari Nurminen (born March 29, 1969) is a Finnish former professional ice hockey forward, who last played with Herlev Hornets in the Danish Oddset Ligaen.

Career 
Nurminen started and played most of his ice hockey career with TPS in SM-liiga. He has also played for two seasons in the Swedish Elitserien.

During the 1994–1995 season, he played successfully with Esa Keskinen for HV71, together making up a fearsome duo.

For the 1996–97 season, he was contracted by Los Angeles Kings in NHL. After only one season in NHL with 67 matches played (scoring 16 goals and 11 assists) he returned to Scandinavia. In the 2000–01 season, he played two games for the Minnesota Wild and registered one goal.

Nurminen also played for HPK and Jokerit in SM-liiga; HC Davos in Nationalliga A; and Frölunda HC and HV71 in Elitserien.

Nurminen won the Finnish Championship twice. He also won the 1993 European Champions Cup with TPS.

Nurminen scored 7 goals in 12 games in World Championships and 243 goals in SM-liiga. During the 1999–2000 season he played 64 games and scored 46 goals in SM-liiga.

Nurminen ended his active playing career with the Danish team Herlev Hornets.

Career statistics

Regular season and playoffs

International

References

External links

1969 births
Living people
Cleveland Lumberjacks players
Finnish ice hockey left wingers
Frölunda HC players
HC Davos players
HC TPS players
Herlev Hornets players
HPK players
HV71 players
Jokerit players
Los Angeles Kings draft picks
Los Angeles Kings players
Minnesota Wild players
Sportspeople from Turku
TuTo players